Eugenia Bujak (born 25 June 1989) is a racing cyclist, who currently rides for UCI Women's WorldTeam . She competed in the 2013 UCI women's road race in Florence for Poland, and has represented Slovenia in competition since 2018.

Major results

2012
 3rd Time trial, Polish National Road Championships
2013
 Polish National Road Championships
1st  Road race
2nd Time trial
 Grand Prix Vienna
1st Individual pursuit
1st Points race
1st Scratch
2nd Sprint
2nd Team sprint (with Natalia Rutkowska)
2nd 500m time trial
2014
 1st  Points race, UEC European Track Championships
 1st  Time trial, Polish National Road Championships
 Panevėžys
1st Individual pursuit
2nd Scratch
 2nd GP du Canton d'Argovie
 3rd Overall Gracia-Orlová
 3rd Winston-Salem Cycling Classic
 Grand Prix Galichyna
3rd Individual pursuit
3rd 500m time trial
 4th Overall Giro della Toscana Int. Femminile — Memorial Michela Fanini
 4th Nagrada Ljubljane TT
 4th Giro del Trentino Alto Adige-Südtirol
2015
 1st  Time trial, Polish National Road Championships
 3rd Overall Gracia–Orlová
 6th La Madrid Challenge by La Vuelta
 8th Overall La Route de France
 European Games
9th Road race
9th Time trial
 9th Ronde van Gelderland
 9th Ljubljana–Domžale–Ljubljana TT
 10th Overall Thüringen Rundfahrt der Frauen
1st Stage 2
2016
 1st GP de Plouay – Bretagne
 3rd Overall La Route de France
1st Stages 1 & 6
 4th La Classique Morbihan
 5th Omloop van Borsele
 6th Ljubljana–Domžale–Ljubljana TT
 7th Ronde van Gelderland
 8th Madrid Challenge by La Vuelta
 9th Grand Prix de Plumelec-Morbihan Dames
 10th Overall Tour of Chongming Island
2017
 1st  Sprints classification Thüringen Rundfahrt der Frauen
 2nd Overall Grand Prix Elsy Jacobs
 2nd Omloop van Borsele
 2nd Ljubljana–Domžale–Ljubljana TT
 4th GP de Plouay – Bretagne
 4th Madrid Challenge by La Vuelta
 6th Time trial, UEC European Road Championships
 7th Overall Belgium Tour
 7th Trofeo Alfredo Binda-Comune di Cittiglio
 7th Winston-Salem Cycling Classic
 8th Tour of Guangxi
2018
 1st  Time trial, Slovenian National Road Championships
 3rd Ljubljana–Domžale–Ljubljana TT
 4th Dwars door Vlaanderen
 6th Overall BeNe Ladies Tour
 7th Time trial, UEC European Road Championships
 7th Overall Festival Elsy Jacobs
 7th Overall Thüringen Rundfahrt der Frauen
 7th Overall The Women's Tour
 7th Overall Holland Ladies Tour
 7th Chrono des Nations
 9th Amstel Gold Race
 9th GP de Plouay – Bretagne
 10th Postnord UCI WWT Vårgårda  road race
2019
 Slovenian National Road Championships
1st  Time trial
1st  Road race
 4th Overall Women's Tour of Scotland
 5th Overall Madrid Challenge by la Vuelta
 5th Chrono Champenois
 European Games
6th Time trial
10th Road race
 7th Ljubljana–Domžale–Ljubljana TT
 7th Giro dell'Emilia Internazionale Donne Elite
2020
 4th Road race, Slovenian National Road Championships
 7th Omloop Het Nieuwsblad
2021
 Slovenian National Road Championships
1st  Time trial
1st  Road race
 4th La Classique Morbihan
 6th GP de Plouay
 8th Dwars door Vlaanderen
2022
 Slovenian National Road Championships
1st  Road race
2nd Time trial
 Mediterranean Games
2nd  Time trial
8th Road race

Notes

References

External links
 
 
 
 
 
 
 

1989 births
Living people
Polish female cyclists
Slovenian female cyclists
People from Trakai District Municipality
Cyclists at the 2015 European Games
European Games competitors for Poland
European Games competitors for Slovenia
Cyclists at the 2019 European Games
Olympic cyclists of Slovenia
Cyclists at the 2020 Summer Olympics
Mediterranean Games silver medalists for Slovenia
Competitors at the 2022 Mediterranean Games
21st-century Polish women
21st-century Slovenian women